USS Sioux (ID-1766) was a cargo ship in the United States Navy.

Sioux was built in 1916 by the American Ship Building Company, Cleveland, Ohio, was acquired by the U.S. Navy on 1 December 1917 from the Clyde Steamship Co., New York City, and commissioned the same day as a unit of the Naval Overseas Transportation Service.

World War I Atlantic operations 
Sioux carried coal between Navy coaling stations along the east coast, including Boston, Bermuda, and Key West. On 30 August 1918, she commenced the first of two voyages overseas, sailing from Norfolk to Glasgow via St. Nazaire. After discharging her cargo of coal, she sailed from Glasgow on 12 October, returning to Norfolk on 1 November. Sailing again from Norfolk on 28 November, this time on a U.S. Army account, she arrived at La Pallice, France, on 16 December. There, she received urgent voyage repairs and was held in European waters as being unsuitable for North Atlantic use during the winter months.

Decommissioning 
Selected for demobilization, she sailed on 19 February 1919, via the southern route, and arrived at Norfolk on 21 March. She was decommissioned on 14 April 1919 and returned to the Clyde Steamship Co., the same day. Sioux remained in merchant service until scrapped in 1929.

References 
 
The Booklet Letters from Oregon Boys in France (1917) contains a long letter from Orlem K. Bullard, a crew member, describing a trip to Rio de Janeiro and Montevideo in 1917.

External links 
 Naval Historical Center Online Library of Selected Images: USS Sioux
 Photo gallery at navsource.org

Ships built in Cleveland
1916 ships
Colliers of the United States Navy
World War I auxiliary ships of the United States